The Lathe of Heaven is a 1971 science fiction novel by American writer Ursula K. Le Guin. The plot concerns a character whose dreams alter past and present reality.  The story was serialized in the American science fiction magazine Amazing Stories.  The novel received  nominations for the 1972 Hugo and the 1971 Nebula Award, and won the Locus Award for Best Novel in 1972.  Two television film adaptations were released: the  PBS production, The Lathe of Heaven (1980), and Lathe of Heaven (2002), a remake produced by the A&E Network.

Title
The title is from the writings of Chuang Tzu (Zhuang Zhou) — specifically a passage from Book XXIII, paragraph 7, quoted as an epigraph to Chapter 3 of the novel:

To let understanding stop at what cannot be understood is a high attainment. Those who cannot do it will be destroyed on the lathe of heaven. (知止乎其所不能知，至矣。若有不即是者，天鈞敗之。)

Other epigraphs from Chuang Tzu appear throughout the novel. Le Guin chose the title because she loved the quotation. However, it seems that quote is a mis-translation of Chuang Tzu's Chinese text. In an interview with Bill Moyers for the 2000 DVD release of the 1980 adaptation, Le Guin clarified the issue:

...it's a terrible mis-translation apparently, I didn't know that at the time. There were no lathes in China at the time that was said. Joseph Needham wrote me and said "It's a lovely translation, but it's wrong".

She published her rendition of the Tao Te Ching, The Book of the Way and Its Virtue by Lao Tzu, the traditional founder of Taoism (Daoism). In the notes at the end of this book, she explains this choice:

The language of some [versions of the Tao Te Ching] was so obscure as to make me feel the book must be beyond Western comprehension. (James Legge's version was one of these, although I found the title for a book of mine, The Lathe of Heaven, in it. Years later, Joseph Needham, the great scholar of Chinese science and technology, wrote to tell me in the kindest, most unreproachful fashion Legge was off on that one; when the book [Tao Te Ching] was written, the lathe hadn't been invented.) 

Translated editions titled the novel differently. The German and first Portuguese edition titles, Die Geißel des Himmels and O flagelo dos céus, mean literally "the scourge [or whip] of heaven". The French, Swedish and second Portuguese edition titles, L'autre côté du rêve, På andra sidan drömmen and Do outro lado do sonho, translate as "the other side of the dream".

Plot summary

The book is set in Portland, Oregon, in the year 2002. Portland has three million inhabitants and continuous rain. It is deprived enough for the poorer inhabitants to have kwashiorkor, a protein deprivation from malnutrition. Although impoverished, the culture is similar to the 1970s in the United States. There is also a massive war in the Middle East. Climate change reduces quality of life.

George Orr, a draftsman and addict, abuses drugs to prevent "effective" dreams that change reality. After one of these dreams, the new reality is the only reality for everyone else, but George retains memory of the previous reality.  Under threat of incarceration, Orr undergoes treatment for his addiction.

George attends therapy sessions with ambitious psychiatrist and sleep researcher William Haber. Orr claims he has the power to dream "effectively". Haber, gradually believing the evidence, seeks to use George's power to change the planet.  His experiments with a biofeedback/EEG machine, nicknamed the Augmentor, enhance Orr's abilities while producing a series of increasingly intolerable alternative worlds based on an assortment of utopian (and dystopian) premises:
 After Haber directs George to dream a world without racism, the skin of everyone on the planet becomes a uniform light gray.
 Eliminating over-population is disastrous after George dreams a devastating plague eliminates most humans.
 George dreams "peace on Earth", resulting in an alien invasion of the Moon and uniting everybody against the potential threat.

Each effective dream gives Haber more wealth and status until he is effectively ruler of the planet.  Orr's finances also improve, but he is unhappy with Haber's meddling and just wants to let things be. Increasingly frightened by Haber's lust for power and delusions of divinity, Orr contacts lawyer Heather Lelache to represent him against Haber.  He falls in love with Heather but is unsuccessful in getting released from therapy.

George tells Heather the "real world" was destroyed during nuclear war in April 1998.  George dreamed it back into existence as he lay dying in the ruins.  He doubts the reality of what now exists, hence his concern for Haber's efforts to improve it.

Heather is present for one of the sessions, allowing her to remember two realities: one where her husband died early in the Middle East War and another where he died just before the truce because of the aliens.  She tries to help George but also tries to improve the planet; when she suggests to a dreaming George that the aliens should no longer be on the Moon, they invade the Earth instead.  In the resultant fighting, Mount Hood is bombed and the 'dormant' volcano produces a spectacular eruption.

After that disaster, George dreams about peaceful aliens.  For a time, everybody experiences stability, but Haber continues meddling.  His suggestion George dream away racism results in everyone becoming gray; Heather's parents are different races, so she never existed in that alternative reality. George dreams a gray version of her with a milder personality, the two marry.  Mount Hood continues to erupt, and he is concerned the planet is losing coherence.

After speaking with one of the aliens, Orr suddenly understands his situation and confronts Haber.  In their final session, Haber "cures" George of his ability to dream effectively by suggesting George dream that his dreams no longer affect reality.  Haber has become frustrated with Orr's resistance and used his research from studying George's brain during his sessions to give himself the same power.  Haber's first effective dream represents a significant break with the various realities created by Orr, and threatens to destroy reality. Despite Orr's efforts to prevent it, the gray Heather is annihilated by the encroaching chaos. Orr successfully shuts off the Augmentor as coherent existence threatens to dissolve into undifferentiated chaos. The world is saved, but exists now as a mix of random elements from several realities.

In the new reality, George works at a kitchen store operated by one of the aliens. Haber survives, his mind shattered by his knowledge of unreality, and only exists because George's dreams restored him.  Heather is also restored, though she is left with only a slight memory of George.  George is resigned to the loss of the Heather he loved, but resolves to romance the one that exists now.  The story ends as the two have coffee, while his inscrutable alien employer observes.

Reception
Theodore Sturgeon, reviewing Lathe for The New York Times, found it to be "a very good book," praising Le Guin for "produc[ing] a rare and powerful synthesis of poetry and science, reason and emotion." Lester del Rey, however, faulted the novel for an arbitrary and ineffective second half, saying "with wonder piled on wonder, the plot simply loses credibility."

Viewpoints

Although technology plays a minor role, the novel is concerned with philosophical questions about our desire to control our destiny, with Haber's positivist approach pitted against a Taoist equanimity.  The beginnings of the chapters also feature quotes from H. G. Wells, Victor Hugo and Taoist sages. Due to its portrayal of psychologically-derived alternative realities, the story is described as Le Guin's tribute to Philip K. Dick.  In his biography of Dick, Lawrence Sutin described Le Guin as having "long been a staunch public advocate of Phil's talent".  According to Sutin, "The Lathe of Heaven was, by her acknowledgment, influenced by his [Dick's] sixties works."
	
The book is critical of behaviorism. Orr, a deceptively mild yet very strong and honest man, is labeled sick because he is immensely frightened by his ability to change reality. He is forced to undergo treatment. His efforts to get rid of Haber are viewed as suspect because he is a psychiatric patient. Haber, meanwhile, is very charming, extroverted, and confident, yet he eventually goes insane and almost destroys reality. He dismisses Orr's qualms about meddling with reality with paternalistic psychobabble, and is more concerned with his machine and Orr's powers than with curing his patient.

The book is also critical of the philosophy of utilitarianism, satirising the phrase "The Greatest Happiness for the Greatest Number." It is critical of eugenics, which it suggests would be a key feature of a culture based on utilitarian ethics.

It has been suggested that Le Guin named her protagonist "George Orr" as an homage to British author George Orwell, as well as to draw comparisons between the dystopic worlds she describes in Lathe and the dystopia Orwell envisioned in his novel 1984.  It might also have the additional meaning either / or.

Adaptations
An adaptation titled The Lathe of Heaven, produced by the public television station WNET, and directed by David Loxton and Fred Barzyk, was released in 1980. It was the first direct-to-TV film production by Public Broadcasting Service (PBS) and was produced with a budget of $250,000. Generally faithful to the novel, it stars Bruce Davison as George Orr, Kevin Conway as William Haber, and Margaret Avery as Heather Lelache. Le Guin was heavily involved in the production of the 1980 adaptation, and expressed her satisfaction with it several times.

PBS' rights to rebroadcast the film expired in 1988, and it became the most-requested program in PBS history. Fans were extremely critical of WNET's supposed "warehousing" of the film, but the budgetary barriers to rebroadcast were high: The station needed to pay for and clear rights with all participants in the original program; negotiate a special agreement with the composer of the film's score; and deal with The Beatles recording excerpted in the original soundtrack, "With a Little Help from My Friends", which is an integral plot point in both the novel and the film. A cover version replaces the Beatles' own recording in the home video release.

The home video release is remastered from a video tape of the original broadcast. PBS, anticipating that the rights issues would beset the production forever, did not save a copy of the film production in their archives. However, a home video has been uploaded and archived on YouTube (see external links).

A second adaptation was released in 2002 and retitled Lathe of Heaven.  Produced for the A&E Network and directed by Philip Haas, the film starred James Caan, Lukas Haas, and Lisa Bonet.  The 2002 adaptation discards a significant portion of the plot and some of the characters. Le Guin had no involvement in making the film.

A stage adaptation by Edward Einhorn, produced by Untitled Theater Company #61, ran from June 6 to June 30, 2012, at the 3LD Art + Technology Center in New York City.

Publication history
 Serialized
 Amazing Science Fiction Stories, March 1971 and May 1971.
 Editions in English
 1971, US, Charles Scribner's Sons, hardcover
 1971, US, Avon Books, paperback
 1972, UK, Victor Gollancz, hardcover
 1974, UK, Panther Science Fiction, paperback (reprinted 1984 by Granada Publishing)
 1984, US, Avon Books, paperback (reprinted 1989)
 1997, US, Avon Books, trade paperback
 2001, US, Millennium Books, paperback
 2003, US, Perennial Classics, paperback
 2008, US, Scribner, paperback
 2014, US, Diversion Books, eBook 
 Audio recording in English
 1999, US, Blackstone Audio Books, 
 Translations
 1971, France: L'autre côté du rêve, Marabout; reprinted in 2002 by Le Livre de Poche, 
 1974, Germany, Die Geißel des Himmels, Heyne, München, 1974, 
 1975, Argentina, La rueda del cielo, Grupo Editor de Buenos Aires.
 1979, Sweden: På Andra Sidan Drömmen, Kindbergs Förlag, 
 1983, Portugal: O Flagelo dos Céus, Publicações Europa-América
 1987, Spain, La rueda celeste, Minotauro, Barcelona, 1987; reprinted in 2017 
 1987, Serbia: Nebeski strug, Zoroaster
 1991, Finland: Taivaan työkalu, Book Studio, 
 1991, Poland: Jesteśmy snem, Phantom Press,  & 83-900214-1-2
 1991, Portugal: Do Outro Lado do Sonho, Edições 70, 
 1992, Hungary: Égi eszterga, Móra, 
 1994, Czech Republic: Smrtonosné sny, Ivo Železný, 
 1997, Russia: 
 2004, Portugal: O Tormento dos Céus, Editorial Presença, 
 2005, Italy: La Falce dei cieli, Editrice Nord, 
 2010, Korea: 하늘의 물레.황금가지, 
 2011, Turkey: Rüyanın Öte Yakası, Metis Yayınları, 
 2013, Romania: Sfâșierea cerului, Editura Trei,

See also

Eye in the Sky
The Man in the High Castle
The Futurological Congress
The Tombs of Atuan
The Word for World Is Forest
Paprika
Psychokinesis
Utopian and dystopian fiction

References
Notes

Bibliography

External links 
 
The Lathe of Heaven 1980's PBS movie adaptation (on YouTube)
Review by Science Fiction Weekly 
The Lathe of Heaven, reviewed by Ted Gioia (Conceptual Fiction )
The Lathe of Heaven at Worlds Without End
A translation of the works of Chuang Tzu (Zhuang Zhou) is available on-line.

1971 American novels
Dystopian novels
1971 science fiction novels
Novels by Ursula K. Le Guin
Post-apocalyptic novels
Novels set in Portland, Oregon
Existentialist novels
Works originally published in Amazing Stories
Novels first published in serial form
Fiction set in 2002
American novels adapted into films
Novels about dreams
American novels adapted into television shows
American novels adapted into plays
Science fiction novels adapted into films
Avon (publisher) books